Fuego is a 2007 action thriller directed by Damian Chapa and starring Damian Chapa, David Carradine, Elena Talan.

Overview
An escaped Mexican prisoner, Julio, crosses paths with a secret agent named Lobo. Lobo changes Julio's name to Fuego and enlists him to rescue an ambassador's daughter taken hostage by a terrorist group.

Cast
Damian Chapa as Fuego / Julio
David Carradine as Lobo
Louise Prieto as Francesca

Film locations
United States, Europe and Ireland.

References

External links
 
 

2007 direct-to-video films
2007 action thriller films
2007 films
American action thriller films
Romar Entertainment films
2000s English-language films
Films directed by Damian Chapa
2000s American films